Bitdefender is a Romanian cybersecurity technology company headquartered in Bucharest, Romania, with offices in the United States, Europe, Australia and the Middle East.

The company was founded in 2001 by the current CEO and main shareholder, Florin Talpeș. Bitdefender develops and delivers cybersecurity products and services, including endpoint protection, cloud and managed security, antivirus software and IoT security. Bitdefender products are distributed through partners in over 150 countries and the US market is estimated to generate more than 40% of its revenues.  As of 2020, the company employed more than 1,600 people worldwide. 

As of August 2021, Bitdefender was ranked 5th globally among Microsoft Windows anti-malware application vendors by market scores.

History 
Bitdefender software was originally developed by SOFTWIN and sold as AVX (Antivirus Expert) from 1996 until 2001, when its name was changed. In 2007, SOFTWIN spun off Bitdefender.

Company milestones 
1990: Creation of Softwin, one of the first IT start-ups in post-communist Romania.

The rapid growth of computer viruses leads to the development of Softwin AVX (AntiVirus eXpert)

2001: The Bitdefender subsidiary is created. AVX solution is rebranded under the Bitdefender name.

2004: First offices outside Romania in US, Germany and UK.

Further expansion in the Middle East (2011), and Denmark / Nordics Region (2015).

2007: Bitdefender becomes a separate business entity with external capital entry.

Axxess Capital Investment Fund becomes a key shareholder.

2011: Bitdefender launches enterprise range and virtualization security products.

2015: Bitdefender creates a new consumer product category with Bitdefender BOX and IoT security services.

2017: Bitdefender makes its first major acquisition by acquiring French partner Profil Technology Source.

British fund Vitruvian buys a 30% stake in the Bitdefender, valuing Bitdefender at more than $600 million.

2018: Bitdefender creates a new subsidiary in Australia through the acquisition of assets from business partner SMS eTech.

Bitdefender acquires behavioral and network security analytics company RedSocks.

2019: Bitdefender opens its own Security Operations Center in San Antonio, Texas.

2021: Bitdefender unveils its extended detection and response (XDR) platform, offering business customers further visibility and incident context during investigations to accelerate threat validation, response actions and remediation.

2022: Bitdefender signed a multi-year partnership deal with Scuderia Ferrari on September 28.

Bitdefender products
Bitdefender develops cybersecurity solutions for businesses and consumers. It offers a range of products and services including endpoint protection, cloud security, and managed detection & response. Its flagship product is Bitdefender Antivirus which protects against viruses, spyware, malware, phishing attacks, ransomware, and other threats.

Fighting cyber-crime 
Bitdefender advises Europol's European Cybercrime Centre (EC3) in supporting investigations into criminal activity in cyberspace, sharing relevant data and knowledge about disruption, prevention, investigation and prosecution. The company is involved in ongoing cooperation with international law enforcement actors such as local, regional and international police offices to support the fight against crime.

Bitdefender is also part of the Cybersecurity Tech Accord for a safer online world, a collaboration among global technology companies committed to protecting their customers and users and helping them defend against malicious threats.

Independent tests 
Bitdefender has won a number of awards from AV-Comparatives, an anti-virus assessment firm.

Controversies and incidents

Trojan.FakeAlert.5 
On March 20, 2010, computers running Bitdefender under 64-bit versions of Windows were affected by a malfunctioning update that classified every executable program as well as dll files as infected. These files were all marked as 'Trojan.FakeAlert.5' and were moved into quarantine. This action led to software and systems malfunctions that affected users around the world.  Bitdefender representatives announced the removal of the faulty update and a workaround for the users affected, except for those using the 2008 version.

DarkSide ransomware 
In 2021, Bitdefender was accused of self-promotion when releasing and publicly announcing a decryptor to the detriment of actual victims with regards to DarkSide, a hacking group.  In 2020, DarkSide switched their main encryption ransomware product over to an "affiliate" model wherein other attackers could download and use their software in exchange for a portion of the profits.  However, they introduced a bug in the process where affiliate hackers would all use the same private RSA key - meaning that a decryption package for a single target who paid the ransom would work on any target that had the ransomware installed.  Security researchers noticed and were quietly already helping victims of the software, but with no public notice, making it so that the attackers would only see an inexplicable decrease in ransom payments that could be written off as chance. At about the same time, Bitdefender researchers developed a decryptor and issued a blog post in January 2021 describing the flaw and offering the decryptor as a free download, in order to make as many organizations as possible aware of its existence to reduce the impact of Darkside ransomware attacks. This was criticized in an article in the MIT Technology Review: claiming, first, Bitdefender's program wasn't even safe - it was flawed and would "damage" files decrypted with it due to bugs within it. Second, the blog post tipped off DarkSide as to the nature of the flaw; DarkSide promptly patched the bug and sarcastically thanked Bitdefender for pointing it out, then went on with their campaign of extortion.  A notable incident that took place after Bitdefender's public disclosure was the Colonial Pipeline cyberattack in May 2021.  While the security researchers who had been using the flaw before acknowledge that it's probable DarkSide would eventually have noticed and fixed the issue, they still criticized Bitdefender for using the bug merely for a brief burst of publicity, rather than in the way that would most help victims of the scheme.  Bitdefender has defended their actions on their blog. The article and blog post triggered a discussion among cybersecurity professionals about the pros and cons of publicly disclosing decryptors.

REvil Ransomware

In September 2021, Bitdefender published a universal decryptor utility that will help past victims of the REvil ransomware  recover their encrypted files.

See also
 Comparison of antivirus software
 Comparison of firewalls
 Comparison of computer viruses
 Multiscanning

References

External links
 
 A Q&A discussion in IT World Canada on whether Bitdefender ought to have released the decryptor software w/r/t DarkSide

Information technology companies of Romania
Software companies of Romania
Companies based in Bucharest
Privately held companies of Romania
Antivirus software
Windows security software
MacOS security software
Android (operating system) software
2001 software
Computer security software companies
Romanian brands
2001 establishments in Romania
Software companies established in 2001